Gabriel Hernández may refer to:

Gabriel Hernández (athlete) (born 1949), Mexican Olympic athlete
Gabriel Hernández (boxer) (1973–2001), Dominican Republic boxer
Gabriel Hernández (footballer) (born 1944), Colombian footballer
Gabriel Hernández (singer), singer, member of the band No Mercy
Gabriel Hernández (water polo) (born 1975), Spanish water polo player and coach